Botou is a town in the Botou Department of Tapoa Province in eastern Burkina Faso. The town has a population of 1,173.

References

External links
Satellite map at Maplandia.com

Populated places in the Est Region (Burkina Faso)
Tapoa Province